The southern naked-tailed armadillo (Cabassous unicinctus) is a species of small armadillo from South America.

Description

The upper body is covered by a dark grey bony carapace of squarish scutes. In the mid part of the body, this carapace is divided into a series of ten to thirteen mobile rings, giving the animal some degree of flexibility. Although there are some bristly hairs around the margins of the scutes, the tail and underside of the animal are hairless. The armour covers the back of the neck and extends onto the head between the ears. Smaller and thinner scales are also found on the cheeks and the outer surface of the ears. The snout is relatively short, and the ears large and funnel-like. There are five clawed toes on each foot, with the middle claws on the forefeet being particularly large.

Distribution and habitat
Southern naked-tailed armadillos are found throughout northern South America east of the Andes, as far south as northern Paraguay and southern Brazil. They inhabit a range of habitats across this region, from tropical rain forest to swamp, cerrado, and open grasslands.

Two subspecies are recognised:Cabassous unicinctus squamicaudis Lund, 1845 - south of the Amazon RiverCabassous unicinctus unicinctus'' Linnaeus, 1758 - north of the Amazon

Biology and behaviour
Southern naked-tailed armadillos are solitary, and are said to be nocturnal in the tropics but have been reported to be diurnal further south. As are many armadillos, it is an insectivore, feeding almost entirely on ants and termites. Reproduction occurs year-round, and animals have lived up to seven years in captivity.

They are typically located in termite mounds.

References

Armadillos
Myrmecophagous mammals
Mammals of Bolivia
Mammals of Brazil
Mammals of Colombia
Mammals of Ecuador
Mammals of French Guiana
Mammals of Guyana
Mammals of Paraguay
Mammals of Peru
Mammals of Suriname
Mammals of Venezuela
Fauna of the Amazon
Mammals described in 1758
Taxa named by Carl Linnaeus